The Jamaican boa,Jamaican yellow boa or yellow snake (Chilabothrus  subflavus; in Jamaican Patois: nanka''''') is a boa species endemic to Jamaica. No subspecies are recognized. Like all other boas, it is not venomous.

Description
The Jamaican boa is golden-green around the head and along the anterior section of the body, with black zigzag crossbars, becoming black toward the posterior end of its body.

Distribution and habitat
Found in Jamaica in the Cockpit Country, including Goat Island. The type locality given is "Jamaica". It lives in moist limestone forests.

Conservation status
The Jamaican boa's natural populations greatly and constantly declined since the late 19th century, mainly because of predation by introduced species (such as mongooses), human persecution, and habitat destruction. In-situ conservation of the Jamaican boa is seriously hindered by the lack of information on demographic and ecological parameters as well as by a poor understanding of the population structure and species distribution in the wild. This species is classified as Vulnerable (VU) on the IUCN Red List of Threatened Species with the following criteria: A2ce (v2.3, 1994). A species is listed as such when the best available evidence indicates that a population decline of 20% is expected within the next ten years or three generations, whichever is the longer, due to a decline in the quality and area of occupancy. It is therefore considered to be facing a high risk of extinction in the wild. Year assessed: 1996.

Their natural habitat is being destroyed, which is forcing them into inhabited areas, where they are captured and killed. Some measures have been taken to afford these animals some protection:
 Listed as a Protected Species under the Wild Life Protection Act (1945).
 Listed on Appendix I of CITES.
 Hunting in forest reserves is also prohibited under the Forest Act (1996).

References

Further reading
 Stejneger, L. 1901. A New Systematic Name for the Yellow Boa of Jamaica. Proc. U.S. National Museum 23: 469–470.

External links

Video - Yellow Boa at Windsor Cave (2014) - Jamaican Caves Organisation - 408 MB mp4.
 

Chilabothrus
Snakes of the Caribbean
Endemic fauna of Jamaica
Reptiles of Jamaica
Reptiles described in 1901
Taxa named by Leonhard Stejneger